Ptychosperma nicolai is a species of plant in the family Arecaceae, endemic to New Guinea. It grows up to 8 meters in height, with red fruit.

Synonyms 
 Actinophloeus nicolai (Sander ex André) Burret
 Romanovia nicolai Sander ex André

References 

 Repert. Spec. Nov. Regni Veg. 24: 263 1928.
 The Plant List
 Encyclopedia of Life
 e-Monocot
 Palm Guide, Fairchild Tropical Botanic Garden

nicolai
Endemic flora of New Guinea
Taxa named by Édouard André
Taxa named by Henry Frederick Conrad Sander
Taxa named by Max Burret